Katina is a given name and surname. It may refer to

 Given name

 Katina (orca) (born 1975), female orca living in Florida
 Katina Papa (1903–1959), Greek author
 Katina Paxinou (1900–1973), Greek film and stage actress
 Katina Schubert (born 1961), German politician

 Surname

 Lena Katina (born 1984), Russian singer and songwriter

See also
The Katinas, a contemporary Christian music group